The Potchefstroom Open is a professional tennis tournament played on hard courts. It is currently part of the ATP Challenger Tour. It is held annually in Potchefstroom, South Africa since 2020.

Past finals

Singles

Doubles

References

ATP Challenger Tour
Hard court tennis tournaments
Tennis tournaments in South Africa
Sport in North West (South African province)
Potchefstroom
2020 establishments in South Africa
Recurring sporting events established in 2020